The men's skeet shooting competition at the 2000 Summer Olympics was the last shooting event of the Sydney Games, held on 22 and 23 September. Mykola Milchev of Ukraine became the first shooter to hit all 150 targets at an Olympic competition in skeet.

Records
Prior to this competition, the existing world and Olympic records were as follows.

Qualification round
The qualification round comprised 75 targets on day 1, and 50 targets on day 2.

EOR Equalled Olympic record – EWR Equalled World record – Q Qualified for final

Final 

EWR Equalled World record – OR Olympic record

References

Sources

Shooting at the 2000 Summer Olympics
Men's events at the 2000 Summer Olympics